Arthur White  (17 January 1880 - 20 August 1961) was the Archdeacon of Warrington from 1947  until 1958.

White was educated at Deytheur Grammar School, St David's College, Lampeter and Oxford University; and ordained in 1905. He held curacies in Ashton-in-Makerfield; and Headington Quarry and incumbencies in Wigan, Golborne and Billinge.

Notes

Archdeacons of Warrington
People educated at Deytheur Grammar School
Alumni of the University of Wales, Lampeter
Alumni of the University of Oxford
1880 births
1961 deaths